Calvocoressi can refer to:

People
 Ion Calvocoressi (12 Apr 1919 – 7 Jul 2007), officer in the British Army in the Second World War, later a stockbroker in the City of London; High Sheriff of Kent in 1978-79
 Michel-Dimitri Calvocoressi (2 Oct 1877 – 1 Feb 1944), music writer and music critic of Greek descent
 Peter Calvocoressi (17 Nov 1912 – 5 Feb 2010), British political author and a former intelligence officer at Bletchley Park during World War II
 George Colvocoresses (1816-1872), military officer